The 2007 Tylenol Players' Championships was held at the Stampede Corral in Calgary, Alberta. April 10-15, 2007. It was the last event of the 2006-07 curling season

Rankings are the CCA rankings.

Men's

A event

B Event

C Event

Championship

Women's

A event

B Event

C Event

Championship

External links
Men's results
Women's results

Curling competitions in Calgary
2007 in Canadian curling
Players' Championship
2007 in Alberta